Rebecca Burlend (1793–1872) is the author of A True Picture of Emigration, a journal and guide written during the period of 1831–1845.  (The full title is A True Picture of Emigration or Fourteen Years in the Interior of North America Being a Full and Impartial Account of the Various Difficulties and Ultimate Success of an English Family Who Emigrated from Barwick-in-Elmet, near Leeds, in the Year 1831.)  She published it anonymously in 1848, receiving credit for the work in 1936.

Rebecca, her husband John, and five of her seven children left their home in Barwick-in-Elmet, Yorkshire, England for Pike County, Illinois, in 1831.  (A son and daughter, both employed, stayed in England.)  Like many settlers arriving in the wilds of North America at the time, she and her family experienced numerous problems before finally achieving stability and success.

1793 births
1872 deaths
Writers from Leeds
People from Barwick-in-Elmet